The 2007–08 Japan Figure Skating Championships were the 76th edition of the event. They were held on December 26–28, 2007 at the Namihaya Dome arena in Kadoma, Osaka. National Champions were crowned in the disciplines of men's singles, ladies' singles, and ice dancing. Results of this competition were used to help pick the teams for the 2008 World Championships and the 2008 Four Continents Championships.

Competition notes
 Nobunari Oda withdrew before the competition.
 The following skaters placed high enough at Junior Nationals and so were invited to compete at Nationals: Takahito Mura, Akio Sasaki, and Yukihiro Yoshida for men, and Rumi Suizu, Yuki Nishino, and Shoko Ishikawa for ladies.

Results

Men

Ladies

Ice dancing

Japan Junior Figure Skating Championships
The 2007–08 Japan Junior Figure Skating Championships took place between November 24 and 25, 2007 in Sendai.

The following skaters placed high enough at Novice Nationals to be invited to compete here: Yuzuru Hanyu (1st in novice, 3rd in junior), Keiji Tanaka (second in novice, 8th in junior), and Ryuju Hino (third in novice, 10th in junior) in men. In ladies, it was Roanna-Sari Oshikawa (1st in novice, 25 in junior), Yukiko Fujisawa (second in novice, 19th in junior), and Miho Sasaki (third in novice, 14th in junior).

Although normally under the rules, a podium finish in the men's event on the Junior level would bring an invitation to compete at the senior level, twelve-year-old Hanyu was not able to be invited due to his age and skating level. Yukihiro Yoshida was therefore invited instead. Hanyu is also not listed as an alternate to Junior Worlds because he is not old enough to attend that competition.

Ayane Nakamura withdrew before the competition.

Men

Ladies

Pairs

Ice dancing

International team selections

World Championships

Four Continents Championships

World Junior Championships
After Junior Nationals, the World Junior team was announced as follows:

External links
 2007–08 Japan Figure Skating Championships results
 2007–08 Japan Junior Figure Skating Championships results 

Japan Figure Skating Championships
2007 in figure skating
2008 in figure skating
2007 in Japanese sport